Bleda was a Hunnic ruler, the brother of Attila the Hun.

As nephews to Rugila, Attila and his elder brother Bleda succeeded him to the throne. Bleda's reign lasted for eleven years until his death. While it has been speculated by Jordanes that Attila murdered him on a hunting trip, it is unknown exactly how he died. One of the few things known about Bleda is that, after the great Hun campaign of 441, he acquired a Moorish dwarf named Zerco.  Bleda was highly amused by Zerco and went so far as to make a suit of armor for the dwarf so that Zerco could accompany him on campaign.

Etymology
Greek sources have Βλήδας and Βλέδας (Bledas), Chronicon Paschale Βλίδας (Blidas), and Latin Bleda.

Otto Maenchen-Helfen considered the name to be of Germanic or Germanized origin, a short form of Bladardus, Blatgildus, Blatgisus. Denis Sinor considered that the name begins with consonant cluster, and as such it cannot be of Altaic origin. In 455 is recorded the Arian bishop Bleda along Genseric and the Vandals, and one of Totila generals also had the same name.

Omeljan Pritsak considered its root bli- had typical vocalic metathesis of Oghur-Bulgar language from < *bil-, which is Old Turkic "to know". Thus Hunnic *bildä > blidä was actually Old Turkic bilgä (wise, sovereign).

Bleda and Attila's rule

By 432, the Huns were united under Rugila. His death in 434 left his nephews Attila and Bleda (the sons of his brother Mundzuk) in control over all the united Hun tribes. At the time of their accession, the Huns were bargaining with Byzantine emperor Theodosius II's envoys over the return of several renegade tribes who had taken refuge within the Roman Empire. The following year, Attila and Bleda met with the imperial legation at Margus (present-day Požarevac) and, all seated on horseback in the Hunnic manner, negotiated a successful treaty: the Romans agreed not only to return the fugitive tribes (who had been a welcome aid against the Vandals), but also to double their previous tribute of 350 Roman pounds (ca. 114.5 kg) of gold, open their markets to Hunnish traders, and pay a ransom of eight solidi for each Roman taken prisoner by the Huns. The Huns, satisfied with the treaty, decamped from the empire and returned to their home, perhaps to consolidate and strengthen their empire. Theodosius used this opportunity to strengthen the walls of Constantinople, building the city's first sea wall, and to build up his border defenses along the Danube.

For the next five years, the Huns stayed out of Roman sight as they tried to invade the Persian Empire. A crushing defeat in Armenia caused them to abandon this attempt and return their attentions to Europe. In 440, they reappeared on the borders of the Roman Empire, attacking the merchants at the market on the north bank of the Danube that had been established by the treaty. Attila and Bleda threatened further war, claiming that the Romans had failed to fulfill their treaty obligations and that the Bishop of Margus had crossed the Danube to ransack and desecrate the royal Hun graves on the Danube's north bank. They crossed the Danube and laid waste to Illyrian cities and forts on the river, among them, according to Priscus, Viminacium (present-day Kostolac), which was a city of the Moesians in Illyria. Their advance began at Margus, for when the Romans discussed handing over the offending bishop, he slipped away secretly to the Huns and betrayed the city to them.

Theodosius had stripped the river's defenses in response to the Vandal Gaiseric's capture of Carthage in 440 and the Sassanid Yazdegerd II's invasion of Armenia in 441. This left Attila and Bleda a clear path through Illyria into the Balkans, which they invaded in 441. The Hunnish army, having sacked Margus and Viminacium, took Singidunum (modern Belgrade) and Sirmium (modern Sremska Mitrovica) before halting. A lull followed in 442, and, during this time, Theodosius recalled his troops from North Africa and ordered a large new issue of coins to finance operations against the Huns. Having made these preparations, he thought it safe to refuse the Hunnish kings' demands.

Attila and Bleda responded by renewing their campaign in 443. Striking along the Danube, they overran the military centers of Ratiaria and successfully besieged Naissus (modern Niš) with battering rams and other siege engines (military sophistication that was new to the Hun repertory), then, pushing along the Nišava, they took Serdica (Sofia), Philippopolis (Plovdiv) and Arcadiopolis (Luleburgaz). They encountered and destroyed the Roman force outside Constantinople and were only halted by their lack of siege equipment capable of breaching the city's massive walls. Theodosius admitted defeat and sent the court official Anatolius to negotiate peace terms, which were harsher than the previous treaty: the Emperor agreed to hand over 6,000 Roman pounds (ca. 1,963 kg) of gold as punishment for having disobeyed the terms of the treaty during the invasion; the yearly tribute was tripled, rising to 2,100 Roman pounds (ca. 687 kg) in gold; and the ransom for each Roman prisoner rose to twelve solidi.

Their demands met for a time, the Hun kings withdrew into the interior of their empire. According to Jordanes (following Priscus), sometime during the peace following the Huns' withdrawal from Byzantium (probably around 445), Bleda died (killed by his brother, according to the classical sources), and Attila took the throne for himself. A few sources indicate that Bleda tried to kill Attila first, to which Attila retaliated.

In 448, Priscus encountered Bleda's widow, then governor of an unnamed village, while on an embassy to Attila's court.

Legacy
Bleda is known by Hungarian literature as Buda. According to medieval sources, Buda the name of the historic capital of the Kingdom of Hungary derived from the name of its founder, Bleda, brother of Hunnic ruler Attila. The name of the capital city of Hungary, Budapest also comes from his name.

Portrayals 

 Ettore Manni portrayed Bleda in the 1954 Anthony Quinn film.
 
 Leo Gordon was Bleda in Sign of the Pagan, released the same year.

 Scottish actor Tommy Flanagan played Bleda in the 2001 mini-series, opposite Gerard Butler, as Attila.

References

Sources
 Priscus. Byzantine History. Bury, J. B. (English translation). Priscus at the court of Attila (online); Dindorf, Ludwig (1870) (the original Greek). Historici Graeci Minores. Leipzig: Teubner.

External links
 

390 births
445 deaths
Hunnic rulers
5th-century murdered monarchs
5th-century monarchs in Europe
5th-century Hunnic rulers